Ferdinand I Gonzaga (26 April 1587 – 29 October 1626) was Duke of Mantua and Duke of Montferrat from 1612 until his death.

Biography
Born in Mantua, he was the son of Vincenzo I and Eleonora de' Medici.

He was appointed a cardinal at the age of 20. A few years after his elder brother, Duke Francesco IV, died in 1612 without male heirs, he renounced the ecclesiastical career and succeeded his brother in both the Duchy of Mantua and the Duchy of Montferrat.

In 1616 he secretly married Camilla Faà di Bruno, whom he divorced in the same year. Their son Francesco Giacinto Teodoro Giovanni Gonzaga, although accepted at court, was not made Ferdinando's heir. He died of the plague during the 1630 siege of Mantua. On 16 February 1617 he married Catherine de' Medici (1593–1629), the daughter of Ferdinand I, Grand Duke of Tuscany.

Ferdinand Gonzaga died in 1626. His younger brother Vincenzo II inherited the duchy.

Family
In 1616 he married Camilla Faà di Bruno, they had:
Francesco Giacinto Gonzaga (4 December 1616 – 1630), Lord of Bianzè since 1624, benefited Priest of St. Benedict Polirone.

Honours
 Grand Master of the Order of the Redeemer
 Knight of Order of Malta

References

Sources

Ancestry

|-

|-

1587 births
1626 deaths
Ferdinando 1
Ferdinando 1
Ferdinando 1
17th-century Italian cardinals
17th-century Italian nobility
Burials at the Palatine Basilica of Santa Barbara (Mantua)